Creation is a 1965 album by jazz musician John Coltrane. 
The 1965 tracks - "Impressions" and "Creation" - were recorded at the Half Note Cafe, New York. "Alabama" was recorded in San Francisco a year before.
"Creation" may be incorrectly titled - the title was drawn from a bootleg album.  This is the only known recording of the tune.  An abbreviated version of the same performance has appeared on several compilation albums (e.g. "Kind Of Coltrane").

Track listing
Original LP release   Creation (Blue Parrot).
 "Alabama” – 6:10
 "Impressions” – 14:11
 "Creation” – 23:05

Personnel
Recorded February 23, 1964 and April 2, 1965.

 John Coltrane — tenor saxophone/soprano saxophone
 McCoy Tyner — piano
 Jimmy Garrison — double bass
 Elvin Jones — drums

1965 live albums
John Coltrane live albums